Jérémy Florès (born 27 April 1988 on Reunion Island) is a French surfer who grew up on Reunion Island, France, where he began surfing at the age of 3. He continued his surfing development on family trips to Australia, Europe and Hawaii, all the while maintaining his education through correspondence courses. He turned professional in 2007, the same year in which he was awarded 'Rookie of the Year' by the WSL, and has won the prestigious Billabong Pipeline Masters in Hawaii both in 2010 and 2017.  In 2015, Jeremy also beat reigning champion Gabriel Medina in the prestigious Billabong Pro Teahupoo, Tahiti with a 16.57 total heat score.

From 2012-2015 Reunion Island has had a much larger than normal problem with sharks attacking surfers and bodyboarders along its beaches. As a local surfing legend, Jeremy is often asked his opinion.  He knows many people that have been maimed and killed on the island, including a friend he calls his brother, who lost his life in a shark attack. He also is frustrated that the French government doesn't seem to want to help fix the shark problem, which he believes is exacerbated by a nearby fishery.

On October 11, 2019, Florès won the Quiksilver Pro France held in Hossegor of southwest France. He did so by dominating finals day, getting the highest scores in all of the rounds that day, including a 15.50 in the Round of 16, 14.40 in the Quarterfinals, 16.33 in the Semis and 15.00 in the Finals. He scored 8+ waves in the Rounds of 16 and 8, following up with a 9-point wave in the Semis and a near perfect 9.67 in the Finals.

Career Victories

See also
ASP World Tour

References

1988 births
French surfers
Living people
World Surf League surfers
Olympic surfers of France
Surfers at the 2020 Summer Olympics